Corner Brook (2021 population: 19,333 CA 29,762) is a city located on the west coast of the island of Newfoundland in the province of Newfoundland and Labrador, Canada. Corner Brook is the fifth largest settlement in Newfoundland and Labrador.

Located on the Bay of Islands at the mouth of the Humber River, the city is the second-largest population centre in the province behind St. John's, and smallest of three cities behind St. John's and Mount Pearl. As such, Corner Brook functions as a service centre for western and northern Newfoundland. It is located on the same latitude as Gaspé, Quebec, a city of similar size and landscape on the other side of the Gulf of St. Lawrence. Corner Brook is the most northern city in Atlantic Canada.

It is the administrative headquarters of the Qalipu Mi'kmaq First Nations band government. The Mi'kmaq name for the nearby Humber River is "Maqtukwek".

History

The area was surveyed by Captain James Cook in 1767. The Captain James Cook Historic Site stands on Crow Hill overlooking the city.  By the middle of the 19th century the population of Corner Brook was less than 100, and the inhabitants were engaged in fishing and lumber work.

The area was originally four distinct communities, each with unique commercial activities: Curling, with its fishery; Corner Brook West (also known as Humber West or Westside) with its retail businesses; Corner Brook East (also known as Humbermouth and the Heights) with its railway and industrial operations; and Townsite (known as Corner Brook) to house employees of the pulp and paper mill, laid out in 1923 by Thomas Adams using Garden City principles. In 1956, these four communities were amalgamated to form the present-day City of Corner Brook.

Between 1948 and 1958 about 70 people from Latvia and Germany settled in Corner Brook. They came as part of then Premier Joseph Smallwood's New Industries program. They built and worked at North Star Cement and the Atlantic Gypsum Plant. (For more history on the subject, see Latvians and Baltic Germans in Corner Brook)

Corner Brook is home to the Corner Brook Pulp & Paper Mill (owned by Kruger Inc.), which is a major employer for the region. The city has the largest regional hospital in western Newfoundland. It also has a wide array of shopping and retail businesses and federal and provincial government offices. It is home to Grenfell Campus, Memorial University, as well as campuses of Academy Canada and College of the North Atlantic.

Corner Brook celebrated its Come Home Year from July 19–28, 2019.

Demographics 

Ethnic origin

Sports
Near Corner Brook is Marble Mountain Ski Resort, a downhill skiing resort, and Blow-Me-Down trails, a cross country ski area.

The Corner Brook Royals currently play in the West Coast Senior Hockey League and were the winners of the 1986 National Title, the Allan Cup. The Royals play their home games at the Corner Brook Civic Centre, formerly the Canada Games Centre. The arena was built in 1997 and was one of the main venues used when the city of Corner Brook hosted the 1999 Canada Games.

Corner Brook was host of the Special Olympics Provincial Winter Games in February, 2011.  The city also twice hosted Raid the North Extreme, a televised 6-day multi-sport expedition race held in wilderness locations across Canada, and was a leg of the ITU World Cup Triathlon.

In 2004, Corner Brook hosted the annual World Broomball Championship.

Arts and culture

Corner Brook is home to Grenfell Campus, Memorial University where a strong arts community exists both within the school and well into the public. The campus houses the Grenfell Art Gallery. The Corner Brook Arts and Culture Centre among other institutions thrive in promoting the arts on all levels from visual arts to theatre and well beyond. In 2015, the City's newest theatre and gallery, the Rotary Arts Centre opened.

Theatre Newfoundland Labrador is Corner Brook's professional theatre company: founded in 1979 by the late Maxim Mazumdar, it operates a year-round professional theatre company from its home base, Corner Brook.  From September to May, their Sarah McDonald Youth Theatre offers classes in acting, stagecraft and music to youth aged 6 to 8 and produces a number of youth and community oriented productions in and around the city. From May to September it produces a professional repertory summer festival in Cow Head, Gros Morne National Park and regular national and international touring of plays like Tempting Providence by Robert Chafe, With Cruel Times in Between by Sarah McDonald, based on the various works by Al Pittman and Our Frances by Berni Stapleton.

Corner Brook is home to Gros Morne Summer Music, a classical music festival that spans July and August. The Hangashore Folk Festival was a folk festival based in Corner Brook from 1980–1994.

For 32 years, the March Hare literary festival ran every March and celebrated poetry and written works by poets and writers from around Newfoundland and Labrador, Canada, and the world. Atlantic Canada's largest poetry festival was founded in the late 1980s by poet and playwright Al Pittman, and Corner Brook author, historian Rex Brown. The last March Hare was held in 2018.

Corner Brook is also home to the region's only community radio station, Bay of Islands Radio (CKVB-FM 100.1, or BOIR). The station was previously only available online. However, the station received its broadcast licence from the Canadian Radio-television and Telecommunications Commission on October 6, 2016, and commenced FM broadcasting on November 5, 2017. The radio station is located on Brook Street, in the city's downtown district.

Municipal government

The Corner Brook City Council has six city councillors, in addition to a Mayor. The highest voting winning councillor becomes Deputy Mayor. The current mayor of the city is Jim Parsons. The deputy mayor is Linda Chaisson. Municipal elections in Corner Brook are held every four years,  on the last Tuesday in September. In the 2021 municipal elections held on September 28, 2021, Jim Parsons was re-elected Mayor.

Transportation

Route 1, the Trans-Canada Highway, passes the south side of the city on a high ridge before descending to the east, into the Humber Valley.

Corner Brook Transit is a privately operated local bus service. The city is also served by four taxi cab companies.

Climate

Corner Brook has a humid continental climate (Dfb) typical of most of Newfoundland. It is warmer in summer than St. John's due to less maritime exposure, whereas winters are colder than in the provincial capital. In terms of its overall climate, it is quite maritime, especially taking into account how the climate is in mainland Canada on similar latitudes. Precipitation is heavy year-round, but highest in December and January and lowest in April and May, with relatively more dry, stable conditions extending into July many years. 
   
The Corner Brook area lies in an especially heavy snow belt because of cold Arctic air masses from mainland Canada, coming from the west or northwest, crossing the waters of the Gulf of St. Lawrence and picking up moisture, resulting in "sea-effect" snow (similar to "lake effect" snow in US locations like Muskegon and Sault Ste. Marie, Michigan). The "sea effect" snow comes in addition to the heavy snow that can accompany mid-latitude storms, called "nor'easters," that approach the area from the U.S. Northeastern and New England states. Such storms can bring high winds and heavy precipitation, with possibly-changing precipitation types in a single storm. The combination of intense winter storms and "sea effect" snow make December and January the wettest months on average in Corner Brook.

Notable people
 Irma Gerd, Drag Queen who competed on Canada's Drag Race Season 3
 Ian Arthur, politician
 Keith Brown, National Hockey League player
 Brian Byrne, former lead singer of rock band I Mother Earth
 Frank Coleman, businessman
 Allison Crowe, musician
 Donald B. Dingwell, scientist
 Gary Graham, music teacher, Order of NL recipient
 Doug Grant, National Hockey League goaltender
 Bruce Grobbelaar, former professional association football goalkeeper
 Susan Kent, actress
 Jason King, National Hockey League player
 Joe Lundrigan, National Hockey League player
 Adriana Maggs, actress, director, and writer
 Trent McClellan, comedian
 Dick Nolan, musician
 Al Pittman, poet and playwright

See also
 List of cities and towns in Newfoundland and Labrador
 Blomidon Golf & Country Club
 Corner Brook Civic Centre
 Corner Brook Regional High
 Grenfell Campus
 Herdman Collegiate (High School)
 Latvians and Baltic Germans in Corner Brook, Newfoundland
 Marble Mountain Ski Resort

References

External links

 
Cities in Newfoundland and Labrador
Populated coastal places in Canada
Populated places established in 1956